Geoffrey Chaucer was an English author, poet, philosopher, bureaucrat courtier, and diplomat.

Chaucer may also refer to:
 2984 Chaucer, a small main belt asteroid
 Chaucer (crater), a lunar crater
 Chaucer (surname)
 Chaucer Elliott (1879–1913), Canadian sportsman
 Chaucer Holdings, a British insurance firm
 A variety of rose

Education
 Chaucer College, an independent Anglo-Japanese college of higher education in Canterbury, UK
 Chaucer School, Canterbury, a secondary school in Kent that closed in 2015
 Chaucer School, Sheffield, a secondary school in South Yorkshire

See also